Alyona Klimenko  (born 19 September 1982) is a Kazakhstani female water polo player. As a member of Kazakhstan's national water polo team, she competed at the 2004 Summer Olympics.

References

1982 births
Living people
Kazakhstani female water polo players
Water polo players at the 2004 Summer Olympics
Olympic water polo players of Kazakhstan
Place of birth missing (living people)
21st-century Kazakhstani women